Beverstedt is a former Samtgemeinde ("collective municipality") in the district of Cuxhaven, in Lower Saxony, Germany. Its seat was in the town Beverstedt. It was disbanded on 1 November 2011, when its constituent municipalities merged into the municipality Beverstedt.

The Samtgemeinde Beverstedt consisted of the following municipalities:
Appeln  
Beverstedt 
Bokel 
Frelsdorf  
Heerstedt  
Hollen  
Kirchwistedt  
Lunestedt 
Osterndorf
Stubben

References

Former Samtgemeinden in Lower Saxony